The 2013–14 season was the 94th season in the existence of FC Istres and the club's first-ever season in the second division of French football. In addition to the domestic league, FC Istres participated in this season's editions of the Coupe de France and the Coupe de la Ligue.

Players

First-team squad
As of 21 January 2014.

Transfers

In

Out

Pre-season and friendlies

Competitions

Overall record

Ligue 2

League table

Results summary

Results by round

Matches
The league fixtures were announced on 13 June 2013.

Coupe de France

Coupe de la Ligue

Notes

References

FC Istres seasons
FC Istres